William N. Violett House, also known as the Jack Dueck Residence, is a historic home located at Goshen, Elkhart County, Indiana.  It was built about 1854, and is a two-story, "T"-shaped, Italianate style red brick dwelling.  It features cornice brackets, heavy frieze molding, and arched openings.

It was added to the National Register of Historic Places in 1984.

References

Houses on the National Register of Historic Places in Indiana
Italianate architecture in Indiana
Houses completed in 1854
Houses in Elkhart County, Indiana
National Register of Historic Places in Elkhart County, Indiana